The 8th Cavalry Division (8. Kavallerie-Division) was a unit of the German Army in World War I. The division was formed on the mobilization of the German Army in August 1914. The division was dissolved in April 1918. The majority of the division was drawn from the Kingdom of Saxony.

Combat chronicle 
It was initially assigned to III Cavalry Corps, which preceded the 6th Army on the Western Front. On 30 August 1914, it was transferred to the Eastern Front, where it arrived too late for the Battle of Tannenberg but in time for the Battle of the Masurian Lakes. It was dismounted in 1917 and dissolved on 9 April 1918.

A more detailed combat chronicle can be found at the German-language version of this article.

Order of Battle on mobilisation 
On formation, in August 1914, the component units of the division were:

23rd Cavalry Brigade (from XII (1st Royal Saxon) Corps District)
1st Royal Saxon Guards Heavy Cavalry
17th (1st Royal Saxon) Uhlans "Emperor Francis Joseph of Austria, King of Hungary"
38th Cavalry Brigade (from XI Corps District)
2nd Jäger zu Pferde
6th Jäger zu Pferde
40th Cavalry Brigade (from XIX (2nd Royal Saxon) Corps District)
Carabiniers (2nd Royal Saxon Heavy Cavalry)
21st (3rd Royal Saxon) Uhlans
Horse Artillery Abteilung of the 12th (1st Royal Saxon) Field Artillery Regiment
8th Cavalry Machine Gun Detachment
Cavalry Pioneer Detachment
Cavalry Signals Detachment
Heavy Wireless Station 25
Light Wireless Station 16
Light Wireless Station 20
Cavalry Motorised Vehicle Column 8

See: Table of Organisation and Equipment

Changes in organization 
23rd Cavalry Brigade joined 1st Cavalry Division on 1 February 1917.
38th Cavalry Brigade joined Guard Cavalry Division on 20 April 1918.
40th Cavalry Brigade dissolved on 10 April 1918.
39th Cavalry Brigade joined from 4th Cavalry Division on 1 February 1917. Rejoined 4th Cavalry Division on 6 April 1918.

See also 

German Army (German Empire)
German cavalry in World War I
German Army order of battle (1914)

References

Bibliography 
 
 
 

Cavalry divisions of Germany in World War I
Military units and formations established in 1914
Military units and formations disestablished in 1918